Young Bombs are a Canadian electronic music duo currently signed to Sony Music Canada. The duo is based in Vancouver, British Columbia and is composed of DJ/producers Tristan Norton and Martin Kottmeier. Starting in 2014, the pair began working on remixes for acts like The Chainsmokers, Lady Gaga, Billie Eilish, Galantis, and numerous others. In 2019, they began releasing original music for the first time with the single, "Starry Eyes", which reached No. 31 on the Dance Club Songs chart.

History
Tristan Norton and Martin Kottmeier are both natives of Vancouver, British Columbia and met while playing in different bands in high school. The two began making music together and eventually moved to Los Angeles to form part of the backing band for a pop artist. They moved back to Vancouver some time after and began writing jingles, including one for Pizza Hut. The two also initially wanted to form an indie rock band. The name "Young Bombs" comes from a short-lived band they formed with another friend. The two decided to focus on EDM after Kottmeier took an interest in the genre.

In 2014, the two released various remixes of songs by acts like Galantis ("You"), Cazzette ("Sleepless"), and Sigma ("Nobody to Love"), among others. In 2015, Young Bombs played their first live show, opening for The Chainsmokers at New City Gas in Montreal. That year, they also continued releasing remixes, including those for Nick Jonas ("Teacher"), Secondcity ("I Wanna Feel"), and Fletcher ("War Paint"). In 2016, the pair played in Las Vegas for the first time, again opening up for The Chainsmokers at Hakkasan. New remixes that year included those for acts like Billie Eilish ("Ocean Eyes"), Troye Sivan ("Wild"), and Rozes ("Burn Wild"), among others.

In 2017, Young Bombs played numerous festivals, including Lollapalooza, the Firefly Music Festival and the Shaky Beats Music Festival. They also released remixes of songs by Lady Gaga ("The Cure") and Selena Gomez ("Kill Em with Kindness") among others. In November 2017, the duo released a 7-minute spoof of the Netflix series, Stranger Things, entitled, Stranger Bombs. The video featured cameos from Shaun Frank and The Chainsmokers' Alex Pall and also included portions of the Young Bombs' remix of Alan Walker's "Faded".

In 2018, the duo played at the Life Is Beautiful Music & Art Festival. They also released remixes for The Chainsmokers ("This Feeling" featuring Kelsea Ballerini), Bazzi ("Mine"), and Weezer ("Say It Ain't So"). 

After years of making successful remixes, Young Bombs wanted a change. They explained, "As an artist, you want a song to be your own and have your fans connect with your creations." In March 2019, the duo released its first original single, "Starry Eyes" which reached No. 20 on the Canada Top 40 Chart. It was also the first recording they released after signing to Astralwerks. Young Bombs released a second song, "Don't Let Them", in May 2019. They released the single "Better Day" featuring Aloe Blacc in October of 2019 which reached No. 16 on the Canada Top 40 chart, becoming their highest charting single yet. Young Bombs shared that Aloe was their first choice to feature on the song, which they say has a "universal message" that listeners everywhere can connect with.

That year, the duo also played the main stage at the Ultra Music Festival in Miami. As of April 2019, Young Bombs have released  around 85 remixes.

In October 2020, Young Bombs released their debut EP "The Young Bombs Show" featuring new single, "Wrong Side of Love" with Darius Rucker.

In 2021, they received a Juno Award nomination at the Juno Awards of 2021, for Breakthrough Group of the Year.

Discography

Extended plays

Singles

Select remixes

Awards and nominations

References

External links
Young Bombs on SoundCloud

Canadian dance music groups
Astralwerks artists
Canadian musical duos
Remixers